Rajmata Vijaya Raje Scindia Medical College, Bhilwara is a full-fledged tertiary Medical college in Bhilwara, Rajasthan. It was established in the year 2019. The college imparts the degree Bachelor of Medicine and Surgery (MBBS). Nursing and para-medical courses are also offered. The college is affiliated to Rajasthan University of Health Sciences and is recognised by Medical Council of India. The selection to the college is done on the basis of merit through National Eligibility and Entrance Test. Mahatma Gandhi Hospital, Bhilwara and Mother & Child hospital, Bhilwara are the associated hospitals with this college. The college has started its MBBS couse from August 2018.

Courses
Rajmata Vijaya Raje Scindia Medical College, Bhilwara undertakes education and training of students MBBS courses.

References

External links 
 https://education.rajasthan.gov.in/content/raj/education/bhilwara-medical-college--bhilwada/en/home.html#

2018 establishments in Rajasthan
Affiliates of Rajasthan University of Health Sciences
Educational institutions established in 2018
Medical colleges in Rajasthan